Maurice Zermatten (22 October 1910, in Saint-Martin, Valais – 11 February 2001, in Sion) was a French-speaking Swiss writer.

He was born in Saint-Martin, Valais, a small village situated in the Val d'Hérens, in the canton of Valais. He was first educated at the Ecole normale and then at the University of Fribourg. He published his first novel Le Coeur inutile in 1936 at the age of 26. He taught at the College of Sion where he stayed until retirement. In 1952 he became lecturer (French Literature) at the Swiss Federal Institute of Technology Zürich. Maurice Zermatten also performs a military career leading him to the rank of colonel.

He has dedicated himself to several literary genres like novel, storytelling, short story, etc.

Born novelist, Maurice Zermatten describes the novel as "a complete kind where the author creates characters, history and environment. It is a fiction that reflects reality as it draws its imagination in life."

Maurice Zermatten is also Jean Zermatten's father.

Works 
Maurice Zermatten has published about 120 books most of them are novels. He also wrote theater pieces, short stories.

He dedicated works to writers: Charles Ferdinand Ramuz, Léon Savary, Rainer Maria Rilke, Gonzague de Reynold and also to painters : Théodore Stravinski, Charles Menge, Georges Borgeaud, Paul Monnier and Ferdinand Dubuis.

Prizes and distinctions 
Maurice Zermatten won several distinctions like:  (1938 and 1956), Grand prix catholique de littérature for all his work (1959), Gottfried Keller Prize (1959),  (1960),

He also became Officier de l’Ordre du mérite national français des arts et des lettres and Bourgeois d'honneur de la ville de Sion (1976)

1910 births
2001 deaths
People from Hérens District
Swiss writers in French
University of Fribourg alumni
People from Sion, Switzerland
Academic staff of ETH Zurich